Joel Larson (born April 29, 1947) is an American rock drummer and percussionist who is known as a founding member of The Merry-Go-Round and for being associated with The Turtles and The Grass Roots.

Early life 
He lived near Lincoln Park until he was 12 years old. He took up drumming at the age of 12 and moved near Avalon Park until he was 17. During these five years he honed his skills in the rock music scene of the early sixties. He later joined The Grass Roots.

The Bedouins
In 1965, Larson joined a band called The Bedouins and helped them win a Battle of the Bands in San Mateo. Word began to spread about the band. In late 1965, they were asked to come to an audition at the San Francisco Whisky A Go Go. They performed for nightclub owner Elmer Valentine and Lou Adler who was the head of the new label Dunhill Records in Los Angeles. They were selected to become The Grass Roots, a new folk rock group created by Adler and producer/songwriters P. F. Sloan and Steve Barri.

The Grass Roots
The original Grass Roots were Denny Ellis on rhythm guitar, Willie Fulton on vocals and lead guitar, Larson on drums and Dave Stensen on bass. They moved to Los Angeles and took part in recording sessions and played live performances in the exploding LA music scene. They were one of the first house bands for The Trip on the Sunset Strip. All of The Grass Roots were under the age of 18 so their parents had to sign their contracts with Dunhill Records. They performed as the back up band for The Mamas & the Papas and Johnny Rivers. They appeared on the first color broadcast of The Ed Sullivan Show. They performed with Barry McGuire in support of his number one hit "Eve of Destruction". After about a year of live performances and networking in the Los Angeles rock music scene, the group wanted to have more creative control and input on the selection of songs to perform and record. Dunhill Records had a formula for the group already in mind and did not want to vary from it. The group minus Larson returned to San Francisco and continued to perform until Dunhill Records decided to replace them. Larson was offered to continue with new group members but decided to take an opportunity to play with Gene Clark of The Byrds fame.

The Merry-Go-Round and others
Larson then met Emitt Rhodes and formed The Merry-Go-Round in early 1967. The Merry-Go-Round performed at the Fantasy Fair and Magic Mountain Music Festival in 1967 on both days of the music festival. They closed the show on Saturday June 10 and were the second to the show closer on Sunday June 11. This music festival is important because it occurred before The Monterey Pop Festival but did not have a movie to document it for the ages (see List of electronic music festivals). Larson also played with The Turtles in the late 60s. Starting in 1970, he played with Lee Michaels and helped produce the huge radio hit "Do You Know What I Mean".

Rejoined The Grass Roots
In 1971, Larson rejoined The Grass Roots and played with them through the end of their heyday in 1975. He toured nationwide with the group on a heavy schedule in support of Their 16 Greatest Hits, Move Along, Alotta' Mileage and The Grass Roots (Haven Records) albums and associated singles. He also recorded with the group in the studio when returning from the road. From 1976 on, he continued to tour performing their hits in support of the group's last greatest hits album titled The ABC Collection until the early eighties.

Later happenings
In the new wave era, he worked as a dance night promoter in Los Angeles with live broadcasts through radio. He then entered into property management and real estate investment while continuing as a musician in Los Angeles playing with members of The Buckinghams and Paul Revere & The Raiders.

In 2000, Larson started working behind the scenes in the movie and TV entertainment industry as a driver and transportation coordinator. He has built a long list of credits which include major motion pictures such as Mission: Impossible III (2006), The Bucket List (2007), Iron Man (2008), I Love You, Man (2009), Iron Man 2 (2010), Thor (2011) and The Avengers (2012). In television, he has worked for multiple years on the Chuck Lorre hit shows Two and a Half Men, The Big Bang Theory, Mike & Molly and Mom. Larson continues as a musician playing live performances with other notable musicians in the Los Angeles area to the present day.

Revisiting classic music groups
In 2009, Larson was playing and recording with The Merry-Go-Round co-founder and solo artist Emitt Rhodes and Counting Crows co-founder Matt Malley. In 2010, Larson took part in the US Premiere screening for "Emitt Rhodes - The One Man Beatles" film at the Rhino Records Pop Up Store in Westwood, California. In 2011, former Gene Clark Group members Chip Douglas, Bill Rinehart and Larson took part in the High Moon Records label launch party at the Roxy in Los Angeles. They celebrated the release of Gene Clark's "Two Sides To Every Story" and Love's "Black Beauty". There was a musical tribute to Gene Clark and Arthur Lee. In 2014, Larson participated with a panel of music celebrities including Henry Diltz, Danny Hutton, Micky Dolenz and Gail Zappa at the Grammy Museum in Los Angeles discussing the new exhibit "California Dreamin', The Sounds of Laurel Canyon 1965 - 1977".

Larson was in the heat of the action in the rock music and cultural explosion that took place in California in the 60s. He has left a musical legacy by his work in many rock groups that will be enjoyed by listeners for many years to come. He continues in the entertainment industry helping to coordinate the smooth production of film and TV offerings.

Discography

Singles
(All singles are with The Grass Roots except as noted)

Albums
(All albums are with The Grass Roots except as noted)

References

External links

Joel-Larson.com — Official site
The-GrassRoots.com — Official site

American rock drummers
Living people
1947 births
Drummers from San Francisco
The Turtles members
20th-century American drummers
American male drummers